William Nagle may refer to:
William Nagle (author) (1947–2002), Australian author
William Nagle (American football), American football coach
Bill Nagel (William Taylor Nagel, 1915–1981), Major League Baseballer
William Nagle (figure skater) (1885–1970), American figure skater
William P. Nagle Jr. (born 1951), American politician